The Challenger-class cruisers were a pair of second-class protected cruisers built for the Royal Navy in the first decade of the 20th century. One ship, was later transferred to the Royal Australian Navy.

Design and description
The Challenger-class cruisers were essentially repeats of the previous Highflyer class, albeit with more powerful propulsion machinery. They were designed to displace . Their crew consisted of 490 officers and other ranks.

The ships were powered by two 4-cylinder triple-expansion steam engines, each driving one shaft, using steam provided by 18 Babcock & Wilcox or Dürr (Encounter) water-tube boilers. These boilers were heavier and bulkier, but more powerful than the Belleville boilers used in the Highflyer class. The boilers were designed to produce enough steam to allow the engines to reach . The ships easily exceeded their designed power and speeds during their sea trials.

The main armament of the Challenger class consisted of 11 quick-firing (QF)  Mk I guns. One gun was mounted on the forecastle and two others were positioned on the quarterdeck. The remaining eight guns were placed port and starboard amidships. Eight QF 12-pounder 12 cwt guns were fitted for defence against torpedo boats. One additional 12-pounder 8 cwt gun could be dismounted for service ashore. They also carried six 3-pounder Hotchkiss guns and two submerged 18-inch (450 mm) torpedo tubes.

The main guns were fitted with 3-inch gun shields and the conning tower had armour 6 inches thick.

Ships
 - Sold 1920
 - To Australia in 1912 as HMAS Encounter, renamed Penguin 1923, scuttled 1932.

Notes

Footnotes

Bibliography

External links

 
Cruiser classes
Ship classes of the Royal Navy